Thøgersen is a Danish and Norwegian surname. Notable people with the surname include: 

Daniel Thøgersen (born 2000), Danish footballer
Frederikke Thøgersen (born 1995), Danish professional football player
Svein Thøgersen (born 1946), retired Norwegian rower
Thomas Thøgersen (born 1968), Danish former professional footballer
Thyge Thøgersen (1926–2016), Danish long-distance runner
Wilhelm Thøgersen (1913–2005), Norwegian politician for the Labour Party

Danish-language surnames
Norwegian-language surnames